The Dayton Community Hall is a community building located at 410 Bridge St. in Dayton, Wyoming. The hall was built in 1936 by the Works Progress Administration. The people of Dayton used the hall for community gatherings, as their previous community hall was no longer safe for activities. In addition to dances, the hall also hosted basketball games, Dayton Benefit Club meetings, local school events, and political functions. The hall continues to be used for local events.

The hall was added to the National Register of Historic Places on November 25, 2005.

References

External links

Event venues on the National Register of Historic Places in Wyoming
Buildings and structures completed in 1936
Buildings and structures in Sheridan County, Wyoming
Works Progress Administration in Wyoming
National Register of Historic Places in Sheridan County, Wyoming